Superadobe is a form of earthbag construction that was developed by Iranian architect Nader Khalili. The technique uses layered long fabric tubes or bags filled with adobe to form a compression structure. The resulting beehive-shaped structures employ corbelled arches, corbelled domes, and vaults to create sturdy single and double-curved shells. It has received growing interest for the past two decades in the natural building and sustainability movements.

History
Although it is not known exactly how long, Earthbag shelters have been used for decades, primarily as implements of refuge in times of war.  Military infantrymen have used sand filled sacks to create bunkers and barriers for protection prior to World War I.  In the last century other earthbag buildings have undergone extensive research and are slowly beginning to gain worldwide recognition as a plausible solution to provide affordable housing. 
German architect Frei Otto is said to have experimented with earthbags, as is more recently Gernot Minke. It was Nader Khalili who popularized earthbag construction. Initially in 1984 in response to a NASA call for housing designs for future human settlements on the Moon and on Mars, he proposed to use moon dust to fill the plastic Superadobe tubes and velcro together the layers (instead of barbed wire). He came to term his particular technique of earthbag construction "Superadobe".  Some projects have been done using bags as low-tech foundations for straw-bale construction. They can be covered in a waterproof membrane to keep the straw dry.
In 1995, 15 refugee shelters were built in Iran, by Nader Khalili and the United Nations Development Programme (UNDP) and the United Nations High Commissioner for Refugees (UNHCR) in response to refugees from the Persian Gulf War. According to Khalili the cluster of 15 domes that was built could have been repeated by the thousands. The government dismantled the camp a few years later.
Since then, the Superadobe Method has been put to use in Canada, Mexico, Brazil, Belize, Costa Rica, Chile, Iran, India, Russia, Mali, and Thailand, as well as in the U.S.
While Superadobe constructions have generally been limited to approximately 4 meters in diameter, larger structures have been created by grouping several "beehives" together to form a network of domes. There is a 32′ (10m) dome being constructed in the San Ignacio area of Belize, which when finished will be the center dome of an eco-resort complex.

BBC News reported in March 2019 that superadobe structures have withstood earthquakes as severe as 7.2 magnitude.

Methodology

Superadobe's earthbag technique lends itself to a wide range of materials. Polypropylene tubing is ideal, although burlap is also sufficient.  Likewise, while sand, cement or lime are preferred, virtually any fill material (e.g. gravel, crushed volcanic rock or rice hulls) will work. 

After materials are gathered and the dimensions of the building are decided upon, a circular foundation trench is dug, approximately 1 foot deep and 8–14 feet in diameter, giving room for at least two layers of earthbags to be laid down underground. A chain is anchored to the ground in the center of the circle and used as a pair of compasses to trace the shape of the base. Another chain is fastened just outside the dome wall: this is the fixed or height guide and provides an interior measurement for the layers as they corbel higher, ensuring the accuracy of each new layer as it is laid and tamped. 

Between layers of tamped, filled tubes, loop of barbed wire functions as mortar and holds the structure together. Window voids can be placed in several ways: either by rolling the filled tube back on itself around a circular plug (forming an arched header) or by sawing out a Gothic or pointed arch void after the filler material has set.  

Once the corbelled dome is complete, it can be covered in several different kinds of exterior treatments, both for aesthetic reasons and to protect the structure from environmental damage such as that from ultraviolet radiation. Like the materials for the construction itself, there are multiple choices. While CalEarth names plaster as the most common finishing option, soil and living grass have also been used. Khalili has also used a mix of earth and plaster, further covered by a "reptile" layer of cement and earth balls that strengthen the finish by redirecting stress.

Emergency shelters
According to Khalili's website, in an emergency, impermanent shelters can be built with unskilled labor, using only dirt with no cement or lime, and for the sake of speed of construction, windows can be punched out later due to the strength of the compressive nature of the dome/beehive.  Superadobe is not an exact art and similar materials may be substituted if the most ideal ones are not readily available. Ordinary sand bags can also be used to form the dome if no Superadobe tubes can be procured; this in fact was how the original design was developed.  

In an interview with an AIA (American Institute of Architects) representative, Nader Khalili, Superadobe's founder and figurehead, said this about the emergency shelter aspects of Superadobe:

Bibliography
Khalili, Nader. "Nader Khalili." Cal-Earth. 19 Jan. 2007 .
Katauskas, Ted. "Dirt-Cheap Houses from Elemental Materials." Architecture Week. Aug. 1998. 19 Jan. 2007 .
Husain, Yasha. "Space-Friendly Architecture: Meet Nader Khalili." Space.com. 17 Nov. 2000. 19 Jan. 2007 .
Sinclair, Cameron, and Kate Stohr. "SuperAdobe." Design Like You Give a Damn. Ed. Diana Murphy, Adrian Crabbs, and Cory Reynolds. New York: Distributed Art Publishers, Inc., 2006. 104–13.
Kellogg, Stuart, and James Quigg. "Good Earth." Daily Press. 18 Dec. 2005.
Freedom Communications, Inc. 22 Jan. 2007 .
Alternative Construction: Contemporary Natural Building Methods. Ed. Lynne Elizabeth and Cassandra Adams. New York: John Wiley & Sons, Inc., 2000.
Hunter, Kaki, and Donald Kiffmeyer. Earthbag Building. Gabriola Island, BC: New Society Publishers, 2004.
Kennedy, Joseph F. "Building With Earthbags." Natural Building Colloquium. NetWorks Productions. 14 Feb. 2007 .
Aga Khan Development Network. "The Aga Khan Award for Architecture 2004." Sandbag Shelter Prototypes, various locations. 14 Feb. 2007 .
The Green Building Program. "Earth Construction." Sustainable Building Sourcebook. 2006. 14 Feb. 2007 .
NBRC. "NBRC Misc. Photos." NBRC: Other Super Adobe Buildings. 10 Dec. 1997. 14 Feb. 2007 .
CCD. "CS05__Cal-Earth SuperAdobe." Combating Crisis with Design. 20 Sept. 2006. 14 Feb. 2007 .
American Institute of Architects. A Conversation with Nader Khalili. 2004. 14 Feb. 2007 .
New York Times. When Shelter is made from the Earth's Own Dust. 15 Apr 1999

See also

 Earthbag construction

References

External links
  - www.videterra.org, Superadobe Italia, sharing information and promoting superadobe domes and houses. Vide Terra provides superadobe workshops in Italy, Europe and the Mediterranean area.
  Khalili's site describing his explanation of his method which he names "Superadobe", not "Super Adobe".
 earthbagbuilding.com - Includes many photos of Superadobe projects.
calearth-superadobe

Masonry
Appropriate technology
Soil-based building materials
Foundations (buildings and structures)